American Dream Builders is an American home improvement reality competition that premiered on NBC on March 23, 2014. The 10-episode series is hosted by Nate Berkus, while Eddie George and Monica Pedersen judge the competition.

Premise
The series follows twelve contestants as they perform major renovations on two homes each week.

Contestants
The competitors are all home designers and/or home builders from across the United States.

Competitors
 Lukas Machnik – Chicago, Illinois - Winner
 Jay Riordan – Chicago, Illinois - Eliminated Week 10 (runner-up)
 Elaine Griffin – New York City, New York - Eliminated Week 9
 Nina Magon – Houston, Texas - Eliminated Week 9
 Darren Moore – Los Angeles, California - Eliminated Week 8
 Dann Foley – Palm Springs, California - Eliminated Week 7
 Erinn Valencich – Los Angeles, California - Eliminated Week 6
 Vanessa Deleon – Edgewater, New Jersey - Eliminated Week 5
 Andrew Flesher – New York City, New York - Eliminated Week 4
 Christina Salway – Brooklyn, New York - Eliminated Week 3
 Nancy Hadley – Huntington Beach, California - Eliminated Week 2
 Tarrick Love – Nashville, Tennessee - Eliminated Week 1

Episodes

Broadcast
In Australia, the series premiered on September 9, 2015 on LifeStyle Home.

References

External links
 
 

2010s American reality television series
2014 American television series debuts
2014 American television series endings
English-language television shows
Home renovation television series
NBC original programming
Television series by Universal Television